Jaguas may refer to:

Places
Jaguas, Ciales, Puerto Rico, a barrio
Jaguas, Guayanilla, Puerto Rico, a barrio
Jaguas, Gurabo, Puerto Rico, a barrio
Jaguas, Peñuelas, Puerto Rico, a barrio